LDH 125 is a road switcher used by Raykent Lojistik in Turkey. It is used in medium speed movements and heavy-duty switching. It closely resembles the CFR class 73.

External links

References
 LDH 125-793 TEKNİK DETAYLAR RYK- ALPULLU
 LDH 125-408

B-B locomotives
Standard gauge locomotives of Turkey